Ali Sabbagh (born 30 June 1979) is a Lebanese former football referee. He was a full international referee for FIFA between 2008 and 2013, before being banned for life from refereeing due to fixing a match in return for sexual favours.

Career 
Sabbagh refereed in the 2014 FIFA World Cup qualifiers, beginning with the match between Nepal and Timor-Leste. 

On 10 June 2013, the referee was sentenced to six months in jail by a Singapore court, after pleading guilty to influencing two linesmen to help fix an AFC Cup match which took place on 3 April 2013. He and the two linesmen "corruptly receiving gratification in the form of free sexual service", arranged by Singaporean businessman Eric Ding Si Yang. The Asian Football Confederation (AFC) has also banned Sabbagh from refereeing and attending stadiums.

Honours
 Lebanese Premier League Best Referee: 2009–10

References

External links 
 
 

1979 births
People from Aley District
Living people
Lebanese football referees